The University of Nebraska–Lincoln College of Engineering is the engineering college at the University of Nebraska–Lincoln (NU) in Lincoln, Nebraska. NU has offered engineering classes since 1877 and the College of Engineering was formally established in 1909. Since 1970, it has also encompassed the engineering students and facilities at the University of Nebraska Omaha. Lance Perez has served as dean of the college since 2018.

The College of Engineering ranked eighty-seventh by U.S. News & World Report in its 2023 ranking of undergraduate engineering programs. It is made up of seven departments: Biological Systems Engineering, Chemical and Biomolecular Engineering, Civil and Environmental Engineering, the Durham School of Architectural Engineering and Construction, Electrical and Computer Engineering, Mechanical and Materials Engineering, and the School of Computing.

History
The University of Nebraska established the Industrial College in 1872 and five years later offered its first engineering course, though only one student was enrolled. NU's engineering programs initially shared Nebraska Hall (a different building than the Nebraska Hall now used by the College of Engineering) with the agricultural programs of Industrial College. In response to rapidly increasing enrollment in engineering courses, the university constructed Mechanical Arts Hall (later renamed Stout Hall after Oscar Van Pelt Stout, dean of the college from 1912 to 1920) in 1898 to serve as the home of its engineering and mathematics departments. Separate Colleges of Agriculture and Engineering were formally established in 1909.

Shortly after Mechanical Arts Hall was completed, construction began nearby on a new home for the mechanical engineering department. The Mechanical Engineering Laboratories building was opened in 1910 and contained woodworking and machine shops, a foundry, and several laboratories, allowing engineering courses to become more practical and specialized. The building was later renamed for C. R. Richards, who was Associate Dean of the Industrial College at the time of construction and also served as the head architect; Richards Hall was renovated significantly in 2000 and is now primarily used by the Department of Art and Art History.

By the 1920s, Nebraska's electrical engineering department was too large for the antiquated building it had used since its establishment in 1895. Though delayed due to the Great Depression and World War II, Ferguson Hall was opened in 1950 as the new home of electrical engineering and the College of Engineering's administrative offices. The college established a chemical engineering department in 1958. The same year, the College of Engineering purchased a warehouse from the Elgin National Watch Company off the northeast corner of City Campus and remodeled it as Nebraska Hall. Most of the college's offices and classrooms were relocated to Nebraska Hall over the following decade and the Scott Engineering Center was completed in 1972 to house many of the department's laboratories and research centers.

The University of Nebraska–Lincoln absorbed the Municipal University of Omaha (now University of Nebraska Omaha) in the 1950s to form the University of Nebraska system. Shortly after, the same was done to the College of Engineering at both schools; though the Omaha campus has its own facilities, its degree programs, faculty, and funding come from Lincoln and its students are considered part of the Lincoln university.

In 2020, the College of Engineering began construction on the $115-million Kiewit Hall, located just east of Nebraska Hall and the Scott Engineering Center. Kiewit Hall was the second of three phases in a $190 million project that also involved construction of the Engineering Research Center and a complete remodeling of the Scott Engineering Center.

Research

The College of Engineering operates seven research centers it describes as "core facilities": the Design and Fabrication Laboratory, Engineering & Science Research Support Facility, Holland Computing Center, Nano-Engineering Research Core Facility, Nebraska Manufacturing Extension Partnership, Nebraska Innovation Studio, and Water Sciences Laboratory. It is closely affiliated with the Biological Process Development Facility, Industrial Agricultural Products Research Center, Midwest Roadside Safety Facility, Mid-America Transportation Center, Nebraska Energy Science Research Center, Nebraska Tractor Test Laboratory, and Nebraska Transportation Center.

Holland Computing Center
The Holland Computing Center (HCC) is a high-performance computing core with locations at the June and Paul Schorr III Center for Computer Science and Engineering in Lincoln and the Peter Kiewit Institute in Omaha. The center was named after donor Richard Holland.

The Crane supercomputer is HCC's most powerful supercomputer and is used as the primary computational resource for many researchers within the University of Nebraska system across a variety of disciplines. When it was implemented in 2013, Crane was ranked No. 474 in the TOP500 ranking of the most powerful non-distributed computer systems in the world. HCC operates four other supercomputers, which it has termed Rhino, Red, Attic, and Anvil. The Firefly, which was retired in 2017, ranked No. 43 in the TOP500 rankings upon its construction in 2007.

Midwest Roadside Safety Facility
The College of Engineering operates the Midwest Roadside Safety Facility (MwRSF), which researches highway design and safety with a particular emphasis on safety performance evaluations of roadside appurtenances. Since its establishment in 1974, the facility has evaluated existing barriers and frequently developed new design concepts and technologies for use on public roadways. The facility is headquartered at the Prem S. Paul Research Center just east of NU's City Campus and uses an approximately quarter-mile stretch of runway at the Lincoln Airport to conduct its crash tests. MwRSF receives funding from the National Cooperative Highway Research Program and frequently presents at the Transportation Research Board Annual Meeting.

MwRSF engineers designed and tested the SAFER barrier, an energy-absorbing "soft wall" system installed at all high-speed oval race tracks used by NASCAR and IndyCar.

Peter Kiewit Institute
The Peter Kiewit Institute in Omaha is a part of the College of Engineering. It was founded in 1996 in partnership with private-sector companies (notably the Kiewit Corporation) with a stated goal of "helping meet the needs of the nation's technology and engineering firms by providing a top-flight education to students interested in pursuing careers in information science, technology and engineering." The Holland Computing Center in Omaha is located inside the Peter Kiewit Institute.

External links
College of Engineering
Biological Systems Engineering
Chemical and Biomolecular Engineering
Civil and Environmental Engineering
Durham School of Architectural Engineering and Construction
Electrical and Computer Engineering
Mechanical and Materials Engineering
School of Computing
Peter Kiewit Institute

References

University of Nebraska–Lincoln
Engineering schools and colleges in the United States